The Hoopes–Smith House is a late Victorian period, Queen Anne Style home built between 1890 and 1892 in Rockport, Texas by James M. Hoopes (1839–1931), a prominent local businessman and land developer.

The home later served as a boarding house between 1894 and 1930. In 1934, the house was sold to T. Noah Smith, Sr. (1888–1955) another prominent businessman with dealings in oil and shipbuilding.

The house was designated a Texas Historic Landmark in 1989 and added to the National Register of Historic Places in 1994. The house is located at 28.0271° -97.0497°, 417 N. Broadway, Rockport, Texas, United States and is currently used as a bed and breakfast.

See also

National Register of Historic Places listings in Aransas County, Texas
Recorded Texas Historic Landmarks in Aransas County

References

Houses on the National Register of Historic Places in Texas
Bed and breakfasts in Texas
Houses in Aransas County, Texas
National Register of Historic Places in Aransas County, Texas
Recorded Texas Historic Landmarks